Leslie Alexander Gillett (February 15, 1881 – February 20, 1969) was an American football coach. He served as the third head football coach at the University of Arizona, coaching for one season in 1902 and compiling a record of 5–0. He was later chief highway engineer of New Mexico from 1918 to 1922.

Head coaching record

References

External links
 

1881 births
1969 deaths
Arizona Wildcats football coaches
Arizona Wildcats football players